Baa Baa Black Sheep (renamed for Season 2 as Black Sheep Squadron and later syndicated under that title) is a television series that premiered on September 21, 1976, with a lead-in movie ("Flying Misfits") and ran from September 23, 1976, to April 6, 1978.  The series consisted of 2 seasons, a 23-episode Season 1, and a 13-episode Season 2, for a total of 36 episodes.

Series overview

Episodes

Season 1: 1976–77

Season 2: 1977–78

Lists of American drama television series episodes